The Asian red-cheeked squirrel (Dremomys rufigenis) is a species of rodent in the family Sciuridae. It is found in south-eastern Asia.

References

Thorington, R. W. Jr. and R. S. Hoffman. 2005. Family Sciuridae. pp. 754–818 in Mammal Species of the World a Taxonomic and Geographic Reference. D. E. Wilson and D. M. Reeder eds. Johns Hopkins University Press, Baltimore.

Dremomys
Rodents of China
Rodents of India
Rodents of Malaysia
Rodents of Thailand
Rodents of Vietnam
Rodents of Myanmar
Rodents of Laos
Taxonomy articles created by Polbot
Mammals described in 1878
Taxa named by William Thomas Blanford